Xenosaurus  agrenon, the mountain knob-scaled lizard, is a lizard found in Oaxaca of Mexico.

References

Xenosauridae
Reptiles described in 1968
Reptiles of Mexico